This is a list of U.S. Marine Hospitals and Public Health Service Hospitals that operated during the system's existence from 1798 to 1981.  The primary beneficiary of the hospitals were civilian mariners known as the Merchant Marine, although they had other beneficiaries at various times; the system was unrelated to the U.S. Marine Corps.

The Marine Hospital Fund was founded in 1798; it was reorganized into the Marine Hospital Service in 1871 and renamed the U.S. Public Health Service in 1912.  The hospital system became part of the Public Health Service's Bureau of Medical Services when it was created in 1943.  The number of major hospitals peaked at thirty in 1943, and declined to nine in 1970.  The system was abolished in 1981.  Many of the hospitals were transferred to other organizations and are still in use as a variety of purposes, including as hospitals, offices, apartments, and historical sites.

History 

The Marine Hospital Fund was founded in 1798.  Although the system was funded and largely operated by the federal government, they were locally managed with little centralized oversight, and with many positions filled through political patronage.  In 1871, it was reorganized into a centralized administration, the Marine Hospital Service, led by the Surgeon General and staffed by a Commissioned Corps of officers.

As of 1873, 31 Marine Hospitals had been built by the government, of which 10 remained in operation: Chelsea, Chicago, Cleveland, Detroit, Louisville, Mobile, Pittsburgh, Portland, St. Louis, and Key West.  Of the rest, fourteen were sold, one was transferred to the War Department, one abandoned, one burned, one  destroyed by a flood, one by a hurricane, one was damaged by an earthquake and  abandoned; one remained unfinished due to its completion being impracticable.

Over the late nineteenth century, the Marine Hospital Service was given authority over domestic and foreign quarantine functions, and expanded into other public health activities.  In 1899 it formed internal divisions for the first time, with the Division of Hospitals administering the hospital system.  The Marine Hospital Service changed its name to the Public Health Service (PHS) in 1912.

At the end of World War I, PHS instituted a numbering system for hospitals, with numbers 1–23 assigned alphabetically to major Marine Hospitals that were operating or recently closed, with higher numbers going to a large number of new Public Health Service Hospitals at facilities transferred from the U.S. Army.  Many of these new hospitals were transferred in 1922 to the newly created Veterans Bureau, which assumed responsibility for veterans' health benefits from the PHS.

Beginning in the late 1920s and continuing through the New Deal era, a significant building campaign upgraded several hospitals into large, monumental buildings, in contrast with the smaller buildings common for the 19th-century buildings.  By 1936, hospitals were divided into first-class Marine Hospitals, plus second- through fourth-class hospitals.

In 1943, PHS collected its divisions into three operating agencies, and the Division of Hospitals became part of the Bureau of Medical Services.  That year, the hospital system had reached its peak of 30 hospitals.  In 1951, all hospitals were redesignated Public Health Service Hospitals.  As of 1957, the Division of Hospitals operated 13 hospitals, 24 outpatient clinics, plus two neuropsychiatric hospitals and the National Leprosarium, and contracted with 155 other locations.  In 1965, there were 12 general hospitals and the 3 special hospitals.

During the PHS reorganizations of 1966–1973, The Bureau of Medical Services was broken up, and the Division of Hospitals became the Federal Health Programs Service, and then in 1973 became a different Bureau of Medical Services within the Health Services Administration.

The system came under pressure for closure starting in the late 1970s, as healthcare needs for sailors were dwindling, and healthcare for veterans was being taken over by the Veterans Administration.  The PHS hospital system was finally abolished during the Reagan administration in 1981, with the last eight general hospitals transferred to other organizations.  The federal government would however continue to operate the National Leprosarium until 1999.

List
The start year indicates when the hospital opened or was acquired by MHS/PHS.  The end year indicates when the hospital was closed, converted to a clinic, or transferred to another organization.  This list emphasizes hospitals considered major at some point in the system's history; there were also very many hospitals of lower statuses.

References